Parastereopsis is a genus of fungi in the family Cantharellaceae. It is a monotypic genus, and contains one species, Parastereopsis borneensis, described as new to science by British mycologist E.J.H. Corner in 1976.

References

External links
 

Cantharellaceae
Fungi described in 1976
Monotypic Basidiomycota genera